Daniel Thomas Meyer (born August 3, 1952) is an American retired professional baseball player whose career spanned 17 seasons, 12 of which were played in Major League Baseball (MLB) with the Detroit Tigers (1974–76), the Seattle Mariners (1977–81), and the Oakland Athletics (1982–85). Meyer primarily played first base, but also played left field, third base, and right field. He batted left-handed while throwing right-handed.

After attending the University of Arizona and Santa Ana College, Meyer was drafted by the Detroit Tigers during the 1972 Major League Baseball draft. He began his career in the minor leagues with the Bristol Tigers. Meyer made his major league debut in 1974. Over his career in the majors, Meyer compiled a .253 batting average with 411 runs scored, 944 hits, 153 doubles, 31 triples, 86 home runs, and 459 runs batted in (RBIs) in 1,118 games played.

Early life
Meyer was born on August 3, 1952 in Hamilton, Ohio. He attended Mater Dei High School in Santa Ana, California. In 1970, Meyer was inducted into the school's baseball hall of fame. Meyer spent one year (1971) at the University of Arizona. In 1972, Meyer enrolled in Santa Ana College where he played second base on the school's baseball team. He was selected by the Detroit Tigers during the fourth round of the 1972 Major League Baseball draft.

Professional career

Detroit Tigers
In 1972, at the age of 19, Meyer made his professional baseball debut in the Detroit Tigers minor league organization. He was assigned to play with the Bristol Tigers of the rookie-level Appalachian League, where he batted .396 with 93 hits, 11 doubles, six triples, and 14 home runs in 65 games played. On defense, he played second and third base. He led the league in batting average, hits, and total bases (158) that season. During his second professional season in 1973, Meyer was assigned to the Lakeland Tigers of the Class-A Florida State League. With Lakeland, he batted .241 with 114 hits, 17 doubles, six triples, and 10 home runs in 133 games played. In the field, Meyer only played second base. It would later prove to be his last professional season playing at that position.

Meyer began the 1974 season in the minor leagues with the Evansville Triplets of the Triple-A American Association. In 129 games with the Triplets, he batted .302 with 75 runs scored, 146 hits, 26 doubles, seven triples, nine home runs, 57 RBIs, and 10 stolen bases. Meyer was a September call-up for the Detroit Tigers that year. On September 14, 1974, he made his MLB debut with the Tigers in a game against the New York Yankees, where in one at bat he went hitless. He registered his first hit on September 20, in a game against the Milwaukee Brewers. Meyer also hit two home runs in that game, the first coming in the third inning off of Brewers' starter Bill Champion, and the second coming off of Brewers' reliever Bill Travers in the seventh inning. In 13 games with Detroit that year, Meyer batted .200 with five runs scored, 10 hits, one double, one triple, three home runs, seven RBIs, and one stolen base. All of his 12 defensive games were played in left field.

In 1975, Meyer played his first full season at the major league level. He played left field and first base in the field. During the fifth inning of a game against the Boston Red Sox on April 25, Meyer hit a home run to break up Luis Tiant's perfect game bid. One day after hitting the game-winning home run for the Tigers against the Milwaukee Brewers on May 7, Meyer committed a throwing error that let the deciding Texas Rangers' run score. He batted .236 with 56 runs scored, 111 hits, 17 doubles, three triples, eight home runs, 47 RBIs, and eight stolen bases in 122 games played during the 1975 season. Meyer led the American League that year in plate appearances per strikeout with 18.8, which was over four points more than Mickey Rivers, who was second in the league in that statistic.

Meyer played 105 games in 1976 for the Tigers. On the year, he batted .252 with 37 runs scored, 74 hits, eight doubles, four triples, two home runs, 16 RBIs, and 10 stolen bases. His batting average was the highest it would ever be as a Tigers player, despite the decline in at-bats (470 in 1975, 294 in 1976). During the season, Meyer played 47 games in left field, 19 at first base, and one in the designated hitter spot.

Seattle Mariners

During the 1976 Major League Baseball expansion draft, Meyer was selected by the Seattle Mariners, who chose him ninth overall. On June 9, 1977, in a game against the Minnesota Twins, Meyer hit two home runs. In his first season with the Mariners, Meyer batted .273 with 75 runs scored, 159 hits, 24 doubles, four triples, 22 home runs, 90 RBIs, and 11 stolen bases in 159 games played. He led the American League with 159 defensive games at first base. During the Mariners inaugural season, he led the team in hits and RBIs. Meyer also set multiple career highs in 1977 that would stand until the end of his professional tenure in games played, plate appearances (639), at bats (582), runs scored, hits, home runs, RBIs, walks (43), strikeouts (51), on-base percentage (.320), and total bases (257).

In 1978, Meyer saw his offensive statistics decline. In 123 games played, he batted .227 with 38 runs scored, 101 hits, 18 doubles, one triple, eight home runs, 56 RBIs, and seven stolen bases. Defensively, he played 121 games at first base and two games in left field. Meyer was moved back to third base during the 1979 season, while also playing limited time at left field and first base. In June, while Meyer was having success at the plate, he attributed it to switching positions. On the season, Meyer batted .278 with 72 runs scored, 146 hits, 21 doubles, seven triples, 20 home runs, 74 RBIs, and 11 stolen bases in 144 games played.

During the 1980 season, Meyer batted .275 with 56 runs scored, 146 hits, 25 doubles, six triples, 11 home runs, 71 RBIs, and eight stolen bases in 146 games played for Seattle. Meyer spent his final season as a Mariners player in 1981, batting .262 with 26 runs scored, 66 hits, 10 doubles, one triple, three home runs, and 22 RBIs in 83 games played. Meyer saw his playing time decrease that season due to strained abdominal muscles, which had him on the disabled list from the start of the season to April 15.

Oakland Athletics and later career
In December 1981, the Seattle Mariners traded Meyer to the Oakland Athletics in exchange for Rich Bordi. In his first season with the Athletics, Meyer batted .240 with 28 runs scored, 92 hits, 17 doubles, three triples, eight home runs, and 59 RBIs in 120 games played. With Oakland that year, Meyer was primarily used as a first baseman in the field, but did see limited time in right field, and left field. He was also the designated hitter during 38 games. During the 1983 season, Meyer batted .189 with runs scored, 32 hits, nine doubles, one home run, and 13 RBIs in 69 games played.

In 1984, Meyer found himself starting the season in the minor league for the first time in ten years. With the Tacoma Tigers of the Triple-A Pacific Coast League, Meyer batted .293 with 134 hits, 19 doubles, two triples, and seven home runs in 124 games played. Meyer was called up to the majors in September. As a member of the Athletics, Meyer batted .318 with one run scored, seven hits, three doubles, one triple, and four RBIs in 20 games played. After the season, he filed for free agency.

On January 15, 1985, Meyer re-signed with the Athletics. With Oakland that year, Meyer went hitless in 12 at-bats. He was released by the team on May 26. For the duration of the 1985 season, Meyer played with the Triple-A Nashville Sounds, who were the minor league affiliates of the Detroit Tigers. With the Sounds that year, Meyer batted .225 with 36 hits, 13 doubles, one triple, and one home run in 51 games played. During the 1986 season, Meyer played for the Mexico City Reds in the Triple-A Mexican League, although his statistics are not available. He resurfaced in 1987, playing three games with the Class-A San Jose Bees of the California League. Meyer played in the inaugural season of the Senior Professional Baseball Association in 1989–1990 as a member of the Bradenton Explorers.

References
General references

Inline citations

External links

1952 births
Living people
American expatriate baseball players in Mexico
Arizona Wildcats baseball players
Baseball players from Ohio
Bradenton Explorers players
Bristol Tigers players
Detroit Tigers players
Diablos Rojos del México players
Evansville Triplets players
Lakeland Tigers players
Major League Baseball first basemen
Major League Baseball left fielders
Major League Baseball third basemen
Nashville Sounds players
Oakland Athletics players
Sportspeople from Hamilton, Ohio
Santa Ana Dons baseball players
San Jose Bees players
Seattle Mariners players
Tacoma Tigers players